The Rural Municipality of Pinto Creek No. 75 is a rural municipality (RM) in the Canadian province of Saskatchewan within Census Division No. 3 and  Division No. 3. It is located in the southern portion of the province.

History 
The RM of Pinto Creek No. 75 incorporated as a rural municipality on January 1, 1913. It is named after Pinto Creek that flows through the RM.

Geography

Communities and localities 
The following urban municipalities are surrounded by the RM.

Villages
Hazenmore
Kincaid

The following unincorporated communities are within the RM.

Hamlets
Meyronne

Demographics 

Government 
The RM of Pinto Creek No. 75 is governed by an elected municipal council and an appointed administrator that meets on the first Thursday of every month. The reeve of the RM is Brian Corcoran while its administrator is Roxanne Empey. The RM's office is located in Kincaid.

References 

 
Pinto Creek
Division No. 3, Saskatchewan